Marat Zhaparov (born August 25, 1985 in Ridder) is a Kazakhstani ski jumper.

Zhaparov competed at the 2014 Winter Olympics for Kazakhstan. He placed 49th in the normal hill qualifying round, failing to advance, and 48th in the large hill qualifying round.

Zhaparov made his World Cup debut in November 2013. As of September 2014, his best finish is 10th, in a pair of team events in 2013–14. His best individual finish is 50th, at a large hill event at Kuusamo in 2013–14.

World Cup

Standings

Continental Cup

Standings

References

External links 
 
 

1985 births
Living people
Olympic ski jumpers of Kazakhstan
Ski jumpers at the 2014 Winter Olympics
Ski jumpers at the 2017 Asian Winter Games
Asian Games medalists in ski jumping
Medalists at the 2017 Asian Winter Games
Asian Games silver medalists for Kazakhstan
Asian Games bronze medalists for Kazakhstan
People from Ridder, Kazakhstan
Kazakhstani male ski jumpers